Ooststellingwerf is a municipality in the province of Friesland in the northern Netherlands.
It is one of the municipalities of Friesland where the spoken language is not West Frisian; instead, Stellingwerfs, a dialect of Dutch Low Saxon, is spoken here.

Population centres

Hamlets
The hamlets within the municipality are: 't Hoogezand, Aekinga, Bekhof, Bentemaden, Boekhorst, Bovenveld, Bûterheideveld, Buttinga, Canada, De Bult, De Knolle, De Koelanden, De Monden (partially), De Riete, Deddingabuurt, Drie Tolhekken, Elleboog, Egypte, Frankrijk, Hoogeduurswoude, Janssenstichting, Jardinga, Konijnenbuurt, Koudenburg, Klazinga, Laagduurswoude, Medhuizen, Moskou (partially), Nanninga, Nieuwe Vaart, Oude Willem (partially), Petersburg (partially), Prandinga, Rolpaal, Schottelenburg, Schrappinga, Terwisscha, Tronde, Twijtel, Veneburen, Venekoten, Weper, Weperpolder, Willemstad, Zuid (partially) and Zuidhorn.

Topography

Dutch Topographic map of the municipality of Ooststellingwerf, June 2015

Notable people 

 Anne Vondeling (1916 in Appelscha – 1979) a Dutch politician
 Prof Dirk ter Haar FRSE FIP (1919 in Oosterwolde – 2002) an Anglo-Dutch physicist
 Piet Bergveld (born 1940 in Oosterwolde) a Dutch emeritus professor of biosensors, invented ISFET

Sport 
 Joop Alberda (born 1952 in Oosterwolde) a retired volleyball coach
 Halbe Zijlstra (born 1969 in Oosterwolde) a retired Dutch politician
 Jan Kromkamp (born 1980 in Makkinga) a Dutch retired footballer with 316 club caps
 Sjoerd Hamburger (born 1983 in Oldeberkoop) a rower who competes in the single scull, competed in the 2008 and 2012 Summer Olympics
 Marrit Steenbergen (born 2000 in Ooststellingwerf) a Dutch competitive swimmer, gold medallist at the 2015 European Games

References

External links

Official website

 
Municipalities of Friesland